Chanyasorn Sakornchan, nicknamed Fah (born June 18, 1990) is a Thai beauty queen who held the Miss Thailand Universe 2011 title, and she was a contestant in the Miss Universe 2011 pageant in Sao Paulo, Brazil.

Pageantry
On March 26, 2011, Sakornchan was crowned Miss Thailand Universe 2011 by Ximena Navarrete, the reigning 2010 Miss Universe from Mexico. As a press favourite, she also won the Miss Photogenic award. The twelfth edition of Miss Thailand Universe pageant was broadcast live from the Royal Paragon Hall, Siam Paragon in Bangkok with two former Miss Universe winners, Apasra Hongsakula, Natalie Glebova and reigning Miss Universe took part as the telecast judges. Chanyasorn represented Thailand at the 2011 Miss Universe pageant held in São Paulo, Brazil. She went unplaced but her costume received second runner-up in the Best Costume Award.

Stage and screen credits

Television (Channel 7)

References

External links
Official site of Miss Thailand Universe 2011

1990 births
Living people
Miss Universe 2011 contestants
Chanyasorn Sakornchan
Chanyasorn Sakornchan
Chanyasorn Sakornchan
Chanyasorn Sakornchan
Chanyasorn Sakornchan